Trivirostra hordacea is a species of small sea snail, a marine gastropod mollusk in the family Triviidae, the false cowries or trivias.

Description
The length of the shell attains 6 mm. They are white in colour and are characterised by their prominent ribs.

Distribution
This marine species occurs off the Philippines, Hawaii, Fiji, Okinawa, Japan, Nerw South Wales (Australia), Zanzibar.

References

 Fehse D. (2002) Beiträge zur Kenntnis der Triviidae (Mollusca: Gastropoda) V. Kritische Beurteilung der Genera und Beschreibung einer neuen Art der Gattung Semitrivia Cossmann, 1903. Acta Conchyliorum 6: 3-48.
 Liu, J.Y. [Ruiyu] (ed.). (2008). Checklist of marine biota of China seas. China Science Press. 1267 pp.

External links
 Kiener L.C. (1843-1850). Spécies général et iconographie des coquilles vivantes. Vol. 1. Famille des Enroulées. Genres Porcelaine (Cypraea), Linné, pp. 1-166, pl. 1-57
 Mighels J. W. (1845). Descriptions of shells from the Sandwich Islands, and other localities. Proceedings of the Boston Society of Natural History. 2: 18-25. Title page dated 1848.

Triviidae
Gastropods described in 1843